Atikokan Municipal Aerodrome  is a registered aerodrome located  northwest of the town of Atikokan, Ontario, Canada. It is served by a published instrument approach.

See also
Atikokan Water Aerodrome

References

External links
Page about this airport on COPA's Places to Fly airport directory

Registered aerodromes in Rainy River District